The 2017–18 Saint Mary's Gaels men's basketball team represented Saint Mary's College of California during the 2017–18 NCAA Division I men's basketball season. The team was led by head coach Randy Bennett in his 17th season at Saint Mary's. The Gaels played their home games at the McKeon Pavilion in Moraga, California as members of the West Coast Conference. They finished the season 30–6, 16–2 in West Coast Conference play to finish in second place. As the No. 2 seed in the WCC tournament, they defeated Pepperdine in the quarterfinals before losing to BYU in the semifinals. They were one of the last four teams not selected for the NCAA tournament and as a result earned a No. 1 seed in the National Invitation Tournament where they defeated Southeastern Louisiana in the first round and Washington in the second round before losing to Utah in the quarterfinals.

Previous season
The Gaels finished the 2016–17 season 29–5, 16–2 in WCC play to finish in second place. In the WCC tournament, they defeated Portland and BYU before losing to Gonzaga in the championship game. They received an at-large bid to the NCAA tournament. As the No. 7 seed in the West region, they beat VCU in the first round before losing to No. 2-seeded Arizona in the second round.

Offseason

Departures

Incoming transfers

2017 recruiting class

Roster

Schedule and results

|-
!colspan=9 style=| Exhibition

|-
!colspan=9 style=| Non-conference regular season

|-
!colspan=9 style=| WCC regular season

|-
!colspan=9 style=| WCC tournament

|-
!colspan=9 style=| NIT

Source

Rankings

*AP does not release post-NCAA tournament rankings

References

Saint Mary's
Saint Mary's Gaels men's basketball seasons
Saint Mary's
Saint Mary's
Saint Mary's